Tony Chappel (born 28 May 1960) is a former Welsh professional snooker player from Pontarddulais in Swansea, whose career spanned seventeen years from 1984 to 2001.

Career

Throughout his career Chappel produced some notable wins. Some of the players he defeated include: Steve Davis, Terry Griffiths, John Parrott, Stephen Hendry, Alan McManus, Stephen Lee and Ken Doherty. However he could not consistently produce that kind of form and his best finish was one semi-final appearance in 1990, where he lost just 6–5, on the black, to Dennis Taylor. He also reached the quarter-finals and last 16 of many tournaments throughout his career, his last run to this stage of an event being the last 16 of the 1997 Regal Welsh Open.  The highest break of his career was a 143 which he compiled in the qualifying of the 1999 World Championship.

He qualified for the Crucible once, in 1990 losing 10–4 to Tony Knowles in the last 32.

After falling out the top 64 he struggled and eventually retired from professional play in 2001.

In April 2013 Chappel took part in the preliminary qualifiers for the 2013 World Snooker Championship. He beat David Singh 5–2 in the second round. but then lost 5–1 to Patrick Wallace in the third round.

References 

Welsh snooker players
Sportspeople from Swansea
1960 births
Living people